Trollhättan Municipality (Trollhättans kommun or Trollhättans stad) is a municipality in Västra Götaland County in western Sweden. Its seat is located in the city of Trollhättan.

The municipality was created gradually in 1967, 1971 and 1974 during the last local government reform when the City of Trollhättan (itself instituted in 1916) was amalgamated with surrounding municipalities.

The municipality itself prefers to use the denomination Trollhättans stad (City of Trollhättan) for the entire territory, including rural areas. This is purely nominal and has no effect on its status as a unitary municipality.  Until 2012 it was the home of the now defunct Saab Automobile.

Localities
Lextorp
Björndalen
Sjuntorp
Skogshöjden
Trollhättan (seat)
Upphärad
Velanda
Väne-Åsaka
Skoftebyn
Stavre
Halvorstorp
Hjulkvarn
Hjortmossen (Strömslund)

References

External links

Trollhättan Municipality - Official site
Trollhättan - Official tourist site
Pictures of Sweden/Trollhætta - H. C. Andersen 1851
The local newspaper (TTELA)
Kumgang Taekwondo - Martial art
Trollhättan Aikido Dojo - Martial art

 
Municipalities of Västra Götaland County